Maharaja Sir Rajinder Singh  (25 May 1872 – 8 November 1900) was a Maharaja of the princely state of Patiala from 1876 to 1900.  In 1897, he was awarded the Grand Cross of the Star of India for his bravery, by the colonial government. Described as "the first reigning Prince to blend the elements of the English gentleman and Indian potentate."

In the 1890s, he became one of the first Indians to own a car, a French De Dion-Bouton in 1892.

Singh died following a riding accident. He was known for playing polo, cricket, field hockey and English billiards. The maharaja defied his subjects and the British government when he married Florence Bryan, the daughter of his Irish horse master, persuading her to convert to the Sikh faith. He was a close friend of William Beresford and of Frederick Roberts. The Irish composer Thomas O'Brien Butler (1861–1915), who spent some time in India, dedicated a song composition to him.

He was the son of Maharaja Mahendra Singh of Patiala, a member of the Phulkian Dynasty. One of his sons was Maharaja Sir Bhupinder Singh.

References

Jat rulers
Indian Sikhs
Maharajas of Patiala
Punjabi people
1872 births
1900 deaths
Knights Grand Commander of the Order of the Star of India
Indian polo players
Indian players of English billiards